Vicente de Valverde, O.P. (1490–1543) served as the fourth Bishop of Panama (1533–1534).

Biography
Vicente de Valverde was born in Segovia, Spain and ordained a priest in the Order of Preachers. In 1533, Pope Clement VII appointed him Bishop of Panama. He died in 1543.

References

External links and additional sources
 (for Chronology of Bishops) 
 (for Chronology of Bishops) 

1490 births
1543 deaths
Bishops appointed by Pope Clement VIII
Dominican bishops
16th-century Roman Catholic bishops in Panama
Roman Catholic bishops of Panamá